Tafadzwa Manyimo (born March 17, 1977) was a Zimbabwean cricketer. He was a right-handed batsman and a right-arm medium-pace bowler. He was born in Bulawayo.

Manyimo made his debut first-class appearance for a Matabeleland Select XI during a Yorkshire tour of Zimbabwe just before the beginning of the 1996 English cricket season, a match which Yorkshire won by an innings margin.

Manyimo made his only Logan Cup appearance in the final of the 1995/96 competition. While Matabeleland won the match by a comfortable margin, Manyimo scored a duck in the only innings in which he batted.

Manyimo also played rugby union, representing Zimbabwe Sevens at the 2001 Rugby World Cup Sevens.

References

External links
Tafadza Manyimo at Cricket Archive

1977 births
Living people
Zimbabwean cricketers